Alliat is a commune in the Ariège department and Occitanie region in southwestern France.

Geography
Commune in the "Haute-Ariège" part of the Pyrenees located 15 km from the city of Foix and 5 km from the city of Tarascon-sur-Ariège, in the "Parc naturel régional des Pyrénées ariégeoises".

Population
Inhabitants of Alliat are called Alliatois.

Sights
 The "cave of the cow": with distinctive archeological strata discovered in its entrance and in the "salle Monique", opened to the public in 1979. It produced a remarkably rich collection of prehistorical objects from the Magdalenian era (12,000 to 14,000 years old), including a large number of harpoons and assegai points as well as more than 200 pieces of art: bones, engraved reindeer and red deer antlers, sculpture of animals, sometimes of humans, as well as rare species for that period: panther, bear, wolves, Saiga antelope, birds and salmon.
It was one of the first caves explored in Ariège (Félix Garrigou, in 1866). A second salle was discovered in 1952 and was explored by its discoverer, Romain Robert, until 1964.

 Fortified cave Spoulgas d’Alliat: located 100 m south of the cave of the cow.

Activities
 Rock climbing around the caves
 Horse riding

See also
Communes of the Ariège department

References

Communes of Ariège (department)